Nationality words link to articles with information on the nation's poetry or literature (for instance, Irish or France).

Events

Works published

Scotland
 Anonymous, Golagros and Gawain, a Middle Scots romance written in the late 15th century in alliterative metre; based on two episodes from the First Continuation of Chretien de Troyes' Perceval, ou le Conte du Graal
 Andrew Cadiou, Porteous of Nobleness, a Scots version of Alain Chartier's Le Breviaire des Nobles
 William Dunbar:
 The Golden Targe
 Henry the Minstrel, also known as Blind Harry, The Actes and Deidis of the Illustre and Vallyeant Campioun Schir William Wallace, publication year uncertain; written c. 1478 in Scots verse, supposedly derived from a Latin original; one of the most popular works of Scottish poetry of this era
 Robert Henryson, Orpheus and Eurydice, published anonymously, publication year uncertain
 Richard Holland, Buke of the Howlat, publication year uncertain; written c. 1450, in the poem an assembly of birds hears the Owl bitterly complaining against Dame Nature for making him ugly
 John Lydgate, The Complaint of the Black Knight

Other
 William Hendred, The Pylgrymage of Man, London, Great Britain
 Jean Lemaire de Belges, La Concorde du genre humain, Walloon poet published in France

Births
Death years link to the corresponding "[year] in poetry" article:
 April 3 – Jean Daurat also spelled "Jean Dorat"; Latin name: "Auratus" (died 1588), French poet and scholar, member of La Pléiade
 Marin Držić, also known as "Marino Darza" and "Marino Darsa" (died 1567), Croatian dramatist, author and poet

Deaths
Birth years link to the corresponding "[year] in poetry" article:
 February 4 – Conrad Celtes (born 1459), German and Latin-language poet
 May 13 – Martial d'Auvergne (born 1420), French poet
 Pietro Antonio Piatti (born  1442), Italian, Latin-language poet

See also

 Poetry
 16th century in poetry
 16th century in literature
 French Renaissance literature
 Grands Rhétoriqueurs
 Renaissance literature
 Spanish Renaissance literature

Notes

16th-century poetry
Poetry